Andrei Viktorovich Guskov (born 3 February 1985) is a former Russian professional football player.

Club career
He made his debut for FC Torpedo Moscow on 29 April 2003 in a Russian Premier League Cup game against FC Torpedo-Metallurg Moscow.

He played in the Russian Football National League for FC Metallurg Krasnoyarsk in 2006.

External links
 

1985 births
Sportspeople from Dushanbe
Living people
Russian footballers
Association football defenders
FC Torpedo Moscow players
FC Lukhovitsy players
FC Yenisey Krasnoyarsk players
FC Krasnodar players